Akamine (written:  lit. "red ridge") is a Japanese surname. Notable people with the surname include:

Júlio Endi Akamine (born 1962), Brazilian Roman Catholic archbishop
, Japanese politician
, Japanese footballer

See also
Akamine Station, a railway station in Naha, Okinawa Prefecture, Japan

Japanese-language surnames